Under Constantine  the Great Jewish clergy were given the same exemptions as Christian clergy. Constantine, however, supported the separation of the date of Easter from the Jewish Passover (see also Quartodecimanism), stating in his letter after the First Council of Nicaea (which had already decided the matter):
"... it appeared an unworthy thing that in the celebration of this most holy feast we should follow the practice of the Jews, who have impiously defiled their hands with enormous sin, and are, therefore, deservedly afflicted with blindness of soul ... Let us then have nothing in common with the detestable Jewish crowd; for we have received from our Saviour a different way."

Theodoret's Ecclesiastical History records The Epistle of the Emperor Constantine, concerning the matters transacted at the Council, addressed to those Bishops who were not present:
"It was, in the first place, declared improper to follow the custom of the Jews in the celebration of this holy festival, because, their hands having been stained with crime, the minds of these wretched men are necessarily blinded. ... Let us, then, have nothing in common with the Jews, who are our adversaries. ... Let us ... studiously avoiding all contact with that evil way. ... For how can they entertain right views on any point who, after having compassed the death of the Lord, being out of their minds, are guided not by sound reason, but by an unrestrained passion, wherever their innate madness carries them. ... lest your pure minds should appear to share in the customs of a people so utterly depraved. ... Therefore, this irregularity must be corrected, in order that we may no more have any thing in common with those parricides and the murderers of our Lord. ... no single point in common with the perjury of the Jews."

Anti-Judaic legislation
In 329 AD he issued laws prohibiting Jews to own Christian slaves, prohibited mixed marriages and punished by death conversion of Christians to Judaism.

References

Views of Judaism by individual
Ancient Christian anti-Judaism
Constantine the Great